Ramsauer is a surname. Notable people with the surname include:

Carl Ramsauer (1879–1955), professor of physics who discovered of the Ramsauer-Townsend effect
Johann Georg Ramsauer (1795–1874), Austrian mine operator, director of the excavations at the Hallstatt cemetery from 1846 to 1863
Peter Ramsauer (born 1954), German politician

See also
Ramsauer Ache, a river of Bavaria, Germany
Ramsauer–Townsend effect, physical phenomenon involving the scattering of low-energy electrons by atoms of a noble gas

German-language surnames

de:Ramsauer